Andrachne schweinfurthii is a species of plant in the family Phyllanthaceae. It is endemic to Yemen. Its natural habitats are subtropical or tropical dry forests and rocky areas.

References

Phyllanthaceae
Endemic flora of Socotra
Vulnerable plants
Taxonomy articles created by Polbot
Taxa named by Isaac Bayley Balfour